The 1998 NCAA Division I softball season, play of college softball in the United States organized by the National Collegiate Athletic Association (NCAA) at the Division I level, began in February 1998.  The season progressed through the regular season, many conference tournaments and championship series, and concluded with the 1998 NCAA Division I softball tournament and 1998 Women's College World Series.  The Women's College World Series, consisting of the eight remaining teams in the NCAA Tournament and held in held in Oklahoma City at ASA Hall of Fame Stadium, ended on May 25, 1998.

Conference standings

Women's College World Series
The 1998 NCAA Women's College World Series took place from May 21 to May 25, 1998 in Oklahoma City.

Season leaders
Batting
Batting average: .519 – Tanisha Kemp, Morgan State Bears
RBIs: 100 – Leah Braatz, Arizona Wildcats
Home runs: 25 – Kelly Kretschman, Alabama Crimson Tide & Leah Braatz, Arizona Wildcats

Pitching
Wins: 40-9 – Jenny Voss, Nebraska Cornhuskers
ERA: 0.42 (8 ER/132.0 IP) – Liza Brown, DePaul Blue Demons
Strikeouts: 430 – Danielle Henderson, UMass Minutewomen

Records
Freshman class runs:
94 – Kelly Kretschman, Alabama Crimson Tide

Senior class runs:
97 – Alison McCutcheon, Arizona Wildcats

Senior class hits:
117 – Alison McCutcheon, Arizona Wildcats

Team stolen bases:
368 – Alabama State Hornets

Awards
Honda Sports Award Softball:
Nancy Evans, Arizona Wildcats

All America Teams
The following players were members of the All-American Teams.

First Team

Second Team

Third Team

References